Lewisville is a town in Forsyth County, North Carolina, United States of America. The population was 13,388 at the 2020 census, up from 12,639 in 2010. It is a Piedmont Triad community.

Geography

Lewisville is located in western Forsyth County at  (36.098087, -80.416030). U.S. Route 421, a four-lane freeway, passes through the southern part of the town, with access from Exits 242 and 244.

Demographics

2020 Census

As of the 2020 United States census, there were 13,381 people, 5,345 households, and 3,924 families residing in the town.

2000 Census
As of the census of 2000, there were 8,826 people, 3,341 households, and 2,676 families residing in the town. The population density was 822.0 people per square mile (317.3/km2). There were 3,501 housing units at an average density of 326.0 per square mile (125.9/km2). The racial make-up of the town was 93.11% White, 4.19% African American, 0.19% Native American, 1.34% Asian, 0.54% from other races, and 0.62% from two or more races. Hispanic or Latino of any race were 1.23% of the population.

There were 3,341 households, out of which 40.00% had children under the age of 18 living with them, 70.50% were married couples living together, 7.4% had a female householder with no husband present, and 19.90% were non-families. 16.60% of all households were made up of individuals, and 4.7% had someone living alone who was 65 years of age or older. The average household size was 2.64 and the average family size was 2.98.

In the town, the population was spread out, with 26.8% under the age of 18, 5.80% from 18 to 24, 31.70% from 25 to 44, 27.50% from 45 to 64, and 8.20% who were 65 years of age or older. The median age was 38 years. For every 100 females, there were 98.0 males. For every 100 females aged 18 and over, there were 92.6 males.

The median income for a household in the town was $64,571, and the median income for a family was $72,250. Males had a median income of $50,229 versus $34,496 for females. The per capita income for the town was $29,999. About 1.60% of families and 2.50% of the population were below the poverty line, including 2.00% of those under age 18 and 3.00% of those age 65 or over.

Education
Public schools in Lewisville are managed by the Winston-Salem/Forsyth County Schools school district. Forsyth Country Day School, a private K-12 school, is also located in the town.

"Intentionally Small Town"
Although the community marked its 150th anniversary in 2009, Lewisville was not incorporated until August 13, 1991.

Lewisville's early formation and its current approach to planning and growth were influenced by the problems encountered by its neighboring suburb, Clemmons, which was noted for over-commercialization of its downtown area. Lewisville responded with planning that included a ban on drive-through restaurants, the creation of several parks (including one located in the town center), and other features aimed at preserving a small-town feel.

Notable people
Rick Brewer, former administrator at Charleston Southern University in North Charleston, South Carolina, and current president of Louisiana College in Pineville, Louisiana, former resident of Lewisville
Austin Dillon (b. 1990), NASCAR driver
Ty Dillon (b.1992), NASCAR driver
Neal Hendrix (b. 1973), professional skateboarder
Chris Paul (b. 1985), NBA player who grew up in Lewisville

References

External links
 Town of Lewisville official website

Towns in Forsyth County, North Carolina
Towns in North Carolina